The South African Marine Predator Lab (SAMPLA) is a multidisciplinary research institute aimed at uncovering the lives of the marine predators of Southern Africa. SAMPLA’s primary goal is to produce accurate and essential scientific information on marine predators and create awareness on the need to understand and conserve the marine predators and ecosystems of the world.

SAMPLA was established by Ryan Johnson, Enrico Gennari, Stephan Swanson and Toby Keswick in the Summer of 2008

SAMPLA undertakes, disseminates and promotes scientific research aimed at producing unique scientific knowledge on South Africa’s marine predators.

Research projects
The white shark research program at Mossel Bay is multi-faceted, but centred on three main academic pillars. These are:
 Collection of data for collaborate projects.
 Conduction of novel research projects by SAMPLA scientists.
 Offering research facilities, supervision and guidance for graduate student projects at South African universities.

Main projects
 Horizontal and vertical movements of the white shark
 Bite kinematics of white sharks
 Predator-prey dynamics
 White shark genetic profile
 White shark population dynamics
 Thermal eco-physiology of the white shark

External links 
 South African Marine Predator Lab home page
 SAMPLA Photo Gallery
 SAMPLA research projects
 SAMPLA Publications

Research institutes in South Africa
Biological research institutes